Alberto Pigaiani (15 July 1928 – 15 June 2003) was an Italian heavyweight weightlifter. He competed at the 1956 and 1960 Summer Olympics and finished in third and seventh place, respectively. Between 1956 and 1960 he won four medals at the world and European championships.

References

External links 
 
 

1928 births
2003 deaths
Italian male weightlifters
Olympic weightlifters of Italy
Weightlifters at the 1956 Summer Olympics
Weightlifters at the 1960 Summer Olympics
Olympic bronze medalists for Italy
Olympic medalists in weightlifting
Medalists at the 1956 Summer Olympics
European Weightlifting Championships medalists
World Weightlifting Championships medalists
20th-century Italian people
21st-century Italian people